Ron James (born April 28, 1964) is an American football coach who was most recently the head coach of the Atlantic City Blackjacks of the Arena Football League (AFL). He played college football at Siena College. He has been a football coach since 1986. Before becoming the Blackjacks' head coach for their inaugural 2019 season, James coached for the Las Vegas Gladiators from 2005 to 2006, the Utah Blaze from 2010 to 2013, the Pittsburgh Power in 2014, the Portland Steel in 2016, and the Tampa Bay Storm in 2017.

James grew up in Albany, New York, where he played football at Christian Brothers Academy. He then enrolled at Siena College, and played offensive line on the Siena Saints football team from 1982 to 1985.

College career
James accepted a scholarship offer from Siena College, where he was an All-American offensive lineman.

Coaching career
After multiple stops coaching in the NCAA and assistant jobs in the Arena Football League (AFL), James was named the head coach of the Las Vegas Gladiators in 2004. After a he compiled a 12–18 record, James was let go and joined the Utah Blaze staff. After Danny White resigned in 2008, James was promoted to head coach of the Blaze. The Blaze folded following the 2013 season and James was hired after week one of the 2014 season by the Pittsburgh Power when they fired head coach Derek Stingley. The Power folded at the end of the season.

On January 30, 2016, James was hired as the new head coach and general manager of the team that became the Portland Steel, replacing Andy Olson. The Steel folded after the 2016 season.

On October 25, 2016, he was named the head coach of the Tampa Bay Storm. He helped the Storm to a 10–4 regular season record and a berth in ArenaBowl XXX, where they lost to the Philadelphia Soul by a score of 44–40. The Storm, who finished with a 2–14 record in 2016, became the first team in AFL history to have a winning percentage of less than .200 in a season and then earn an ArenaBowl berth the next season. James was named the AFL Coach of the Year in 2017. The Storm folded in December 2017. 

In 2018, James was hired as a senior analyst for the Saskatchewan Roughriders of the Canadian Football League. He returned the AFL in 2019 as the inaugural head coach of the expansion Atlantic City Blackjacks.

Head coaching record
{| class="wikitable" style="font-size: 95%; text-align:center;"
|-
! rowspan=2|Team !! rowspan=2|Year !! colspan=4|Regular season !! colspan=4|Postseason
|-
!Won!!Lost!!Win %!!Finish!! Won !! Lost !! Win % !! Result
|-
!LAS||
||8||8|||| 3rd in AC West || – || – || – || –
|-
!LAS||
||5||10|||| 4th in AC West || – || – || – || –
|-
! colspan=2|LAS total||13||18||||–||–||–||–||
|-
!UTAH||
||1||8|||| 3rd in NC West || – || – || – || –
|-
!UTAH||
||9||7|||| 3rd in NC West || – || – || – || –
|- style="background:#fdd;"
!UTAH||
||12||6|||| 3rd in NC West || 1 || 1 || .500 || 
|-
!UTAH||
||7||11|||| 4th in NC West || – || – || – || –
|-
! colspan=2|UTAH total||29||32||||–||1||1||||
|- style="background:#fdd;"
!PIT||
||15||2|||| 2nd in AC East || 0 || 1 || .000 || 
|- style="background:#fdd;"
!POR||
||3||13|||| 4th in NC || 0 || 1 || .000 || 
|- style="background:#fdd;"
!TAM||
||10||4|||| 2nd in AFL || 1 || 1 || .500 || 
|- 
!AC||
||4||8|||| 5th in AFL || – || – || – || –
|-
! colspan=2|Total||74||77||||||2||4||||
Juan Diego Catholic Football Staff
Juan Diego Christian   2022  Ron James
Head Coach

References

External links 

ArenaFan profile
at ArenaFootball
Pittsburgh Power bio

1964 births
Living people
American football offensive linemen
Siena Saints football players
Siena Saints football coaches
St. Lawrence Saints football coaches
Hartwick Hawks football coaches
Kentucky Wesleyan Panthers football coaches
Army Black Knights football coaches
Houston Thunderbears coaches
Las Vegas Gladiators coaches
Utah Blaze coaches
Pittsburgh Power coaches
Sportspeople from Albany, New York
Cleveland Gladiators coaches
Tampa Bay Storm coaches
Portland Steel coaches